Dateline Philippines is the flagship midday newscast of the ABS-CBN News Channel (ANC) covering the day's most important headlines in politics, business, sports, and entertainment. It concentrates on news from the more than 7,000 islands of the Philippines as reported by ABS-CBN News, the largest news organization in the country.

It is remarkable for being the network's longest running national newscast that originated on cable and was produced by Sarimanok News Network (now ABS-CBN News Channel). It debuted on July 8, 1996, and was first hosted by Frankie Evangelista, Gene Orejana, and Joyce Burton-Titular.

The show now airs from 12:00 NN to 1:00 PM (PST) and is hosted by Karmina Constantino on weekdays and Rica Lazo on Saturdays.

COVID-19 pandemic and ABS-CBN shutdown 
The Sunday edition of Dateline Philippines was no longer produced on March 22, 2020, as a result of the implementation of an enhanced community quarantine to help stop the COVID-19 pandemic in the Philippines.

Furthermore, with ABS-CBN shutting down free-to-air operations due to the expiration of its legislative franchise and in compliance with the NTC's cease and desist order, the current status of the said edition remained unknown until it was eventually cancelled as a result of the network's shutdown and permanent loss of broadcast franchise followed by the company's retrenchment layoffs. Dateline Philippines Sunday was then replaced by provisional programming on the same date.

Dateline Philippines Weekday and Saturday editions resumed on air in full scale on April 26, 2020, when the timesharing of programming between both DZMM TeleRadyo and ANC ended.

Departure of Raine Musñgi  
The newscast's Saturday anchor, Raine Musñgi, had her farewell appearance on October 15, 2022, and she revealed that she would be departing the network after 18 years with ANC. She was replaced the next week by Rica Lazo.

Anchors

Weekdays
Karmina Constantino

Saturday anchor
Rica Lazo (also a substitute anchor for Constantino)

Previous anchors and segment presenters
Frankie Evangelista
Joyce Burton-Titular
Kathy San Gabriel
Gene Orejana
Harry Gasser (segment anchor from ABS-CBN Cebu) 
Ron Cruz (Currently an anchor for newscasts Top Story, The Bureau, News Now Weekend, ANC Headlines, and The World Tonight Weekend)
Ryan Gamboa (segment anchor, ABS-CBN Bacolod)
Gretchen Fullido (segment anchor, showbiz and weather; Currently as Star Patrol segment presenter for TV Patrol)
Ricky Carandang
Erwin Tulfo (currently the Department of Social Welfare and Development Secretary)
Pinky Webb (moved to CNN Philippines)
Tony Velasquez (Currently an anchor for The World Tonight)
Caroline Howard
Alvin Elchico (Currently an anchor for TV Patrol Weekend)
Boyet Sison ("Hardball" segment host)
Raine Musñgi

See also
List of programs shown on the ABS-CBN News Channel
ABS-CBN News Channel
ABS-CBN News and Current Affairs
Headline Pilipinas - Filipino-language regional newscast of DZMM TeleRadyo

References

ABS-CBN News Channel original programming
1996 Philippine television series debuts
English-language television shows
Sign language television shows